Margaret of Jülich ( – 10 October 1425) was a daughter of Duke Gerhard VI of Jülich and his wife, Margaret of Ravensberg (1315-1389).

In 1369, she married Adolf III of the Marck.  She had fourteen children with him, at least five of whom did not survive infancy.
 Mynta (b. )
 Joanna (b. ), abbess of Hörde
 Adolph (1373-1448), succeeded his father in Cleves and later also in the Marck.
 Dietrich (1374-1398), succeeded his father in the Marck.
 Gerhard (d. 1461), also Adolph as count of the Marck
 Margaret (1375-1411), married in 1394 Albert I, Duke of Bavaria (d. 1404)
 Elisabeth (1378-1439), married Reinold of Valkenburg (d. 1396) and Stephen III, Duke of Bavaria
 Engelberta (d. 1458), married Frederick IV of Moers (1376-1448)
 Catherine ( – 1459)

Duchesses of Jülich
1350s births
1425 deaths
15th-century German nobility
15th-century German women
14th-century German nobility
14th-century German women